Kyle Duncan may refer to:
Kyle Duncan (judge) (born 1972), American judge
Kyle Duncan (soccer) (born 1997), American soccer player